Miserden Castle was a castle near the village of Miserden in Gloucestershire, England.

The castle is a large motte and bailey Norman castle, built before 1146 by Robert Musard, after whose family the local village is named. The castle is positioned on a rocky spur, and the north side of the castle was probably flooded from the river to produce a wet moat, further strengthening the considerable defences. Musard was killed by forces loyal to King Stephen during the years of the Anarchy and the castle seized by Philip of Gloucester, but the castle survived into at least the 13th century. Some earthworks and masonry structures remain.

See also
 Castles in Great Britain and Ireland
 List of castles in England

References

Bibliography
Amt, Emilie. (1993) The Accession of Henry II in England: royal government restored, 1149-1159. Woodbridge, UK: Boydell Press. .
Pettifer, Adrian. (1995) English Castles: A Guide by Counties. Woodbridge, UK: Boydell Press. .

Castles in Gloucestershire
Stroud District